Bocking's Elm is a suburb of Clacton-on-Sea, in the Tendring district of Essex, England.


References 

 Essex A-Z (page 184)

Clacton-on-Sea